Francesco Brusco (died 1625) was a Roman Catholic prelate who served as Bishop of Lettere-Gragnano (1599–1625).

Biography
On 27 September 1599, Francesco Brusco was appointed during the papacy of Pope Clement VIII as Bishop of Lettere-Gragnano.
He served as Bishop of Lettere-Gragnano until his death in 1625.

References

External links and additional sources
 (for Chronology of Bishops) 
 (for Chronology of Bishops)  

17th-century Italian Roman Catholic bishops
Bishops appointed by Pope Clement VIII
1625 deaths